Jan Juc is a suburb of Torquay, Victoria.  At the 2016 census, Jan Juc had a population of 3,683.

History 
Nearby Bellbrae was originally called Jan Juc but was renamed in 1923, so the Jan Juc Post Office, which  opened on 25 January 1862, was in fact in Bellbrae. There has never been a post office in the current Jan Juc.

, housing estates almost link Jan Juc to adjacent Torquay, across the Spring Creek. Along with many other parts of the Surf Coast, increasing popularity is placing pressure on the coastal environment.

Jan Juc beach 
The Jan Juc beach lies between Rocky Point to the east and Bird Rock to the west, and is bounded by high cliffs, apart from the middle where an ephemeral creek enters Bass Strait through sand dunes.  The beach is patrolled during summer months by the Jan Juc Surf Life Saving Club.

In the late 1990s, a surfer found the fossilised remains of an extinct genus of whale on a beach near Jan Juc. It was named Janjucetus hunderi, after the location.

Sport
Jan Juc has a Surf Life Saving Club which includes a junior "Nippers" program. The Jan Juc 
Sharks cricket club has eight junior teams and four senior teams that compete in the Geelong Junior Cricket Association and the Bellarine Peninsula Cricket Association respectively. Jan Juc Boardriders is the local surfing club.

References

External links
Official Great Ocean Rd info
Torquay,Jan Juc,Bells Beach Visitor Guide - JanJuc.com.au

Towns in Victoria (Australia)
Surf Coast Shire
Coastal towns in Victoria (Australia)
Surfing locations in Victoria (Australia)
Beaches of Victoria (Australia)